Yngve Evert Pacius (14 June 1886 – 28 August 1962) was a Finnish sailor. He competed in the mixed 6 metres at the 1936 Summer Olympics.

References

1886 births
1962 deaths
People from Raahe
Olympic sailors of Finland
Sailors at the 1936 Summer Olympics – 6 Metre
Finnish male sailors (sport)
Sportspeople from North Ostrobothnia